Sergeant Simon Willard was a founding father of Old Saybrook, Connecticut. Sergeant Willard along with Lieutenant Edward Gibbons, were sent by John Winthrop the Younger. to occupy the mouth of the Connecticut River with 20 carpenters and workmen. On November 24, 1635, the group landed on the west bank at the mouth of what is now the Connecticut River. They located the Dutch coat of arms and replaced it with a shield that had a grinning face painted on it. The group established a small fort with a cannon. When the Dutch returned to the mouth of the river they spotted the English fort and withdrew. The fort was one of the first military establishments in the Connecticut Colony.

References 

 
People of colonial Connecticut
Old Saybrook, Connecticut
Pre-statehood history of Connecticut
People from Old Saybrook, Connecticut